Warren Wilbur Shaw (October 31, 1902 – October 30, 1954) was an American racing driver. He was president of the Indianapolis Motor Speedway from 1945 until his death in 1954. Shaw was the automotive test evaluator for Popular Science magazine.

Biography

He was born in Shelbyville, Indiana on October 31, 1902. He participated in the 1927 Indianapolis 500.

Wilbur Shaw won the Indianapolis 500 race three times, in 1937, 1939 and 1940. Shaw was the second person to win the 500 three times, and the first to win it twice in a row. In the 1941 race, Shaw was injured when his car crashed; it was later discovered that a defective wheel had been placed on his car.

During World War II, Shaw was hired by the tire manufacturer Firestone Tire and Rubber Company to test a synthetic rubber automobile tire at the Indianapolis Motor Speedway, which had been closed due to the war. He was dismayed at the dilapidated condition of the racetrack and quickly contacted then-owner Eddie Rickenbacker, the World War I flying ace and president and founder of Eastern Air Lines. When the United States entered World War II, ending racing at Indianapolis and elsewhere for the duration, Rickenbacker padlocked the gates and let the race course slowly begin to disintegrate.

During a meeting soon after the tire test, Rickenbacker informed Shaw that what was left of the track would be demolished and the land turned into a housing subdivision. Shaw sent out letters to the major car manufacturers trying to find a backer to buy the speedway. However, all indicated that should they buy the IMS they would turn it into a private testing facility for their own cars only.

Shaw then met Terre Haute businessman Tony Hulman who had inherited his family's business, Hulman & Company, a wholesale grocer and producer of coffee and baking powder, Clabber Girl.

A lifelong fan of automobile racing in general and the "500" in particular, Hulman listened with great interest to what Shaw had to say. Despite what Hulman saw amongst the weeds and deterioration when Shaw took him to Indianapolis, he purchased the Speedway from Rickenbacker in November 1945 for the sum of $750,000.

As a reward for his efforts to revive the Speedway, Shaw was appointed as its president, where he would have complete day-to-day control over the track. To this job, Shaw brought his extensive knowledge of the business of auto racing, something Hulman would admit that he himself didn't have, and Shaw's hard work only cemented the reputation of the "500" as the "Greatest Spectacle in Racing."

It seemed as though Shaw and Hulman had a "Midas touch" at the Speedway. Hulman poured money into improvements, and Shaw delivered the world's greatest automobile race to enthusiastic crowds, which grew in number by the year. The Indianapolis "500" of the late Forties and early Fifties was a very special event through the work of Hulman and Shaw, although Hulman was always sure to point out that it was Wilbur putting it all together.

Shaw was killed in an airplane crash near Decatur, Indiana, on October 30, 1954, one day before his fifty-second birthday. The pilot, Ray Grimes, and artist Ernest Roose were also killed.

Legacy
As the automotive test evaluator, Shaw's articles were superior to those of his contemporaries in that they gave consistently accurate reports without relying on Popular Science'''s lead in the marketplace over competitors such as Mechanix Illustrated''.

Shaw's highly regarded autobiography, "Gentlemen, Start your Engines," was published in 1955, and covers events through 1953.

Indianapolis 500 results

Awards
Shaw was inducted into the Indianapolis Motor Speedway Hall of Fame in 1963.
He was inducted into the International Motorsports Hall of Fame in 1991.
He was named to the National Sprint Car Hall of Fame in 1990.
Shaw was inducted in the Motorsports Hall of Fame of America in 1991.

References

Further reading
 Mittman, Dick (2004). Shaw's Blend Of Skill, Charisma Looms Large In Speedway History. Retrieved September 17, 2005.
The Greatest 33 Profile

External links
 
 The Greatest 33

1902 births
1954 deaths
People from Shelbyville, Indiana
Champ Car champions
Indianapolis 500 drivers
Indianapolis 500 winners
International Motorsports Hall of Fame inductees
National Sprint Car Hall of Fame inductees
Executives of Indiana based companies
Racing drivers from Indianapolis
AAA Championship Car drivers
Victims of aviation accidents or incidents in 1954
Victims of aviation accidents or incidents in the United States
Accidental deaths in Indiana
20th-century American businesspeople